Sound Ancestors is a studio album by American musician Madlib. It was released on January 29, 2021 via Madlib Invazion. Produced by Madlib, it was arranged, edited and mastered by Four Tet. The album debuted at number 153 on the Billboard 200 in the United States.

Release
On November 24, 2020, Four Tet announced that he was in the process of making a collaborative album with Madlib during a YouTube livestream.

Four Tet then announced on his Instagram that he and Madlib were ready to release the studio album for January 2021.

The album's tracklist was revealed on January 11, 2021.

Singles
On December 14, 2020, the first single to be released was "Road of the Lonely Ones". The official music video was released on YouTube the same day. Rolling Stone described the single as a "simple but immersive track built around vocals that seem pulled from some forgotten soul 45 gathering dust in a crate."

Madlib and Four Tet released the second single "Hopprock" on January 4, 2021. The music video was released on YouTube on January 9, 2021. Of the single, Stereogum described it as "a warm, hazy instrumental that Madlib and Four Tet wrote together. The track has a neck-cranking beat, a warm bassline, and a few samples chopped into the mix."

The third single "Dirtknock" was released on January 22, 2021.

Critical reception

Sound Ancestors was met with universal acclaim from music critics. At Metacritic, which assigns a normalized rating out of 100 to reviews from mainstream publications, the album received an average score of 87 based on ten reviews. The aggregator AnyDecentMusic? has the critical consensus of the album at a 7.6 out of 10, based on twelve reviews.

Tayyab Amin of The Guardian praised the album with perfect five-out-of-five stars rating, claiming that "Madlib channels a deep, intertwining lineage of Black music through Sound Ancestors like folklore oration, storytelling with the sorcery of a beatmaker who knows how to make an instrumental really sing". Seb Grech of Beats Per Minute described the album as "a realisation of what the Madlib and Hebden are capable of in tandem. It's bold, different, and takes the genre of instrumental hip hop to the next level". Richard Wiggins of God Is in the TV found "this record further cements his status as one of the most creative and inspirational producers of today". Jeff Ihaza of Rolling Stone wrote: "Like Akomfrah's Data Thief, Madlib sees the connections between the past and future. On Sound Ancestors, he manages to give us a sense of what those connections feel like". Leo Culp of The Line of Best Fit wrote that the album "isn't anything new from Madlib, but it only further cements his status as one of the great producers, artists, and minds in hip-hop". Andy Cush of Pitchfork wrote: "Hebden's arrangement of Sound Ancestors shows deep and intuitive engagement with Jackson's weed-scented sensibility, which has no use for presumptive distinctions between the beautiful and the funky, the silly and the profound". Jesse Ducker of Albumism stated that "Madlib has certainly started 2021 on the right foot musically". AllMusic's Paul Simpson wrote: "while Sound Ancestors as a whole seems as lifetime-encompassing as Donuts, it doesn't feel quite as focused. Still, it sounds recognizably like both Madlib and Four Tet while taking their music into directions where neither artist has ventured before, and its highlights are life-affirming". Daryl Keating of Exclaim! called the album "a mixed bag if ever there was one. It's funky, it's psychedelic, it's jazzy, dirty, clean, and mean. It's Madlib". Max Heilman of Spectrum Culture gave the album 3 out of 5 stars, resuming: "Sound Ancestors amounts to cool sonics that fail to leave a lasting impression".

Accolades

Track listing

Personnel
Otis "Madlib" Jackson Jr. – primary artist, production
Kieran "Four Tet" Hebden – arrangement, editing, mastering
Errol F. Richardson – art direction
Richard Foster – photography
Bernie Grundman – lacquer cut

Charts

References

External links

2021 albums
Madlib albums
Albums produced by Madlib